Hassnain Riza is a journalist from Kashmir.

References

Indian journalists
Living people
Year of birth missing (living people)
Kashmiri journalists